Interstate 72 (I-72) is an Interstate Highway in the midwestern United States. Its western terminus is in Hannibal, Missouri, at an intersection with U.S. Route 61 (US 61); its eastern terminus is at Country Fair Drive in Champaign, Illinois. The route runs through the major cities of Decatur, Illinois, and Springfield, Illinois. In 2006, the Illinois General Assembly dedicated all of I-72 as Purple Heart Memorial Highway. The stretch between Springfield and Decatur is also called Penny Severns Memorial Expressway, and the section between mile 35 and the Mississippi River is known as the Free Frank McWorter Historic Highway.

Route description 

|-
|MO
|
|-
|IL
|
|-
|Total
|
|}

Missouri
Its western terminus is an interchange with US 61 to the Mark Twain Memorial Bridge over the Mississippi River. This bridge connects the city of Hannibal with Illinois. Presently, there are only two exits for I-72 in Missouri.

Illinois
I-72 parallels the old Wabash Railroad from Hannibal, east through Illinois to Champaign, Illinois. The Norfolk Southern Railway operates this railroad route today.

The portion of I-72 and I-172 from Springfield to Quincy is commonly referred to as the Central Illinois Expressway (CIE). , I-72 has one business route; I-72 Business (I-72 Bus.) in Jacksonville.

Near Valley City at mile-marker 42 are the Valley City Eagle Bridges. These two individual two-lane spans bridge the Illinois River in rural west-central Illinois. Near milemarker 78, a sign marks 90 degrees longitude.

At its eastern terminus in Champaign, I-72 continues as Church Street (westbound) and University Avenue (eastbound), which stay as one-way streets for an additional  into downtown Champaign.

History

First constructed in 1971, I-72 ran from Springfield at I-55 to Champaign at I-57 until the 1990's. The FHWA preferred to designate the route I-72.

After discussions regarding extending an Interstate Highway through the state of Missouri, on April 22, 1995, AASHTO approved another renumbering. I-172 was renumbered in its entirety as I-72. The US 36 extension west of Fall Creek was also given the I-72 designation. The Illinois Route 336 (IL 336) expressway was renumbered to I-172 from Fall Creek to Fowler.

Prior to September 2000, Mark Twain Avenue (old US 36) was composed of the current Mark Twain Avenue (now Route 79) and the portion of I-72 and US 36 west of exit 157 to the Hannibal city limits. Route 79 terminated at the foot of the old Mark Twain Memorial Bridge at the corner of Third Street and Mark Twain Avenue. Signs along the four lane expressway portion of Mark Twain Avenue marked the route as "Future I-72", while signs along what is now Route 79 had I-72 trailblazers to direct drivers to the temporary terminus at Fall Creek, Illinois. When the new Mark Twain Memorial Bridge was completed in September 2000, I-72 was routed over the new bridge, along with US 36. Route 79 was extended along Mark Twain Avenue to terminate at exit 157.

Chicago–Kansas City Expressway
The concept of I-72 across Missouri was to create the Chicago–Kansas City Expressway, a rural four-lane highway across northern Missouri and west central Illinois from Cameron, Missouri, at I-35 to Springfield, Illinois, at I-55. This would provide a series of rural four-lane highways (I-35, US 36, I-72, and I-55) connecting Chicago to the North American Free Trade Agreement (NAFTA) Corridor (High Priority Corridor 23). This would reduce the amount of through traffic, primarily truck traffic, in the St. Louis, Des Moines, and Quad Cities metropolitan areas by serving as an alternate route for I-70 and I-80. The Missouri portion of this route is designated as part of High Priority Corridor 61.

Based on the  marker at Route 79, if/when US 36 is upgraded to Interstate standards across Missouri, the future western terminus of I-72 would be at Cameron at the intersection with I-35. Currently, the west end of I-72 route is west of US 61 and flows concurrent with US 36 into Illinois. In 2004, US 36 was upgraded to a four-lane expressway between US 61 and US 24 at the Rocket Junction. There are three exits along this expressway: Veterans Road, Shinn Lane (Hannibal Regional Hospital), and US 24 east at the Rocket Junction. Also, an interchange with Route 15 was installed in Shelbina.

Due to funding priorities, upgrading US 36 between Macon and Hannibal was a low-priority project and was shelved. The Missouri Department of Transportation (MoDOT) committed to constructing the four-lane highway as an at-grade expressway only if the five counties served by US 36 east of Macon would contribute half of the $100-million (equivalent to $ in ) cost. In August 2010, the four-lane expressway was completed from Macon to Hannibal, completing Missouri's portion of the Chicago–Kansas City Expressway.

Exit list

Related routes

Auxiliary routes
I-72 currently has one auxiliary route, I-172, that serves as a freeway spur for Quincy.

Business route

Interstate 72 Business (I-72) is a business loop of I-72 in Jacksonville. It runs from the I-72/US 36/US 67 interchange southwest of Jacksonville north along the US 67 bypass of Jacksonville to the former alignment of US 36 (Morton Avenue). On Morton Avenue, I-72 Bus. runs east through downtown Jacksonville until it reaches I-72 at exit 68.

References

External links

 Illinois Highway Ends: Interstate 72

 
72
72
72
Transportation in Marion County, Missouri
Interstate 72
Interstate 72
Interstate 72
Interstate 72
Interstate 72
Interstate 72
Interstate 72